Hassi Khelifa District is a district of El Oued Province, Algeria. As of the 2008 census, it has a population of 40,041.

Communes 

Hassi Khelifa District consists of two communes:
 Hassi Khelifa
 Trifaoui

References 

Districts of El Oued Province